In mathematics, a Littlewood polynomial is a polynomial all of whose coefficients are +1 or −1.
Littlewood's problem asks how large the values of such a polynomial must be on the unit circle in the complex plane.  The answer to this would yield information about the autocorrelation of binary sequences.
They are named for J. E. Littlewood who studied them in the 1950s.

Definition
A polynomial

Littlewood's problem asks for constants c1 and c2 such that there are infinitely many Littlewood polynomials pn , of increasing degree n satisfying

for all  on the unit circle. In 2019, an infinite family of Littlewood polynomials satisfying both the upper and lower bound was constructed by Paul Balister, Béla Bollobás, Robert Morris, Julian Sahasrabudhe, and Marius Tiba.

References

Polynomials
Conjectures